The Ministry of Finance is a government ministry of Antigua and Barbuda responsible for the management of public finances, economic planning, revenue and budgeting.

Ministers of Finance

See also
Government of Antigua and Barbuda
Eastern Caribbean Central Bank
Economy of Antigua and Barbuda

References

Politics of Antigua and Barbuda
Government of Antigua and Barbuda
Economy of Antigua and Barbuda
Antigua and Barbuda